PokerTH is an open-source Texas hold 'em simulator that runs on Windows, Mac OS X, Linux, and Android.  PokerTH is written in C++ using the Qt framework and allows for up to ten human players, with computer-controlled players filling in if there are not enough humans. Players can also play against other PokerTH users online. The game has ample settings so that players can configure and customize play.
The online community is still active as of July 2022, with dozens of active players and several running games at any given time.

History
The PokerTH project was started in 2006 by Felix Hammer and Florian Thauer. Version 0.1 was not released to the public; it only allowed play up to the flop as well as the river. Version 0.2 was released on 4 October of that year, followed by 0.3 on 16 October. By version 0.2, the game could play a complete round. Version 0.4 was released on 4 April 2007 and included a completely new interface, an options dialog and reprogrammed opponents. In June 2007, Version 0.5 added network and online play, as well as sound effects. Internationalization started with version 0.5 and is now up to 20 languages. Version 0.6 was released on 13 December 2007. The most prominent change was the addition of a dedicated game server for online play, as well as IPv6 support. Version 0.7 was released on 3 May 2009, adding support for up to ten players and a new skinnable interface. Version 0.8 was released on 9 September 2010, adding the option to play online ranking games.

In 2011 PokerTH was relicensed from GPLv2 to AGPL.

Version 0.9 was released on January 4, 2012 after a year of development and a busy beta phase. This version introduces one of the most frequently requested feature "possibility to rejoin internet games" after disconnection e.g. trouble with player's internet connection. Players do not have to worry about a drop in rank anymore. Furthermore, there are around 15 other new features and a lot of bugfixes.

As of version 0.9.5, PokerTH now includes preliminary support for Android devices.

As of version 1.0, an Online log file analysis tool was added, sound support and higher screen resolutions for Android devices and support for Windows 8 (desktop mode). There was a license change: OpenSSL exception (for Windows 8 support, because gcrypt currently crashes on Windows 8). Server were re-factored using google protocol buffers which basically enables use of html5 clients.

The latest stable version, 1.1.2, was released on 1 September 2017.

Reception 

PokerTH was selected in April 2013 as "HotPick" by Linux Format. PokerTH became a quite popular freeware game; it was downloaded alone over SourceForge.net between 2007 and May 2017 over 2.8 million times.

See also
List of open-source video games

References

External links
 Official site  

''This article contains material translated from the German Wikipedia article, specifically this version.

Linux games
Maemo games
Works about poker
Open-source video games
Portable software
Software that uses Qt
Freeware games